Manjari Chaturvedi is an Indian Kathak dancer. She belongs to the Lucknow Gharana.

Early life and background
Manjari Chaturvedi was born in a well established family of Lucknow. Her grandfather, Justice Hari Shankar Chaturvedi, was a High Court Judge at The Lucknow bench. Her father, Prof. Ravi Shankar Chaturvedi, was a Geologist and a Geophysics professor at the IIT Roorkee, and a respected Space Scientist who established the Remote Sensing Applications Centre at Lucknow and a visionary in the field of Science & Technology for Rural Development. Her mother Sudha Chaturvedi is a strong, resilient, well read woman who instilled strong values in her children. Manjari spent her early formative years in Lucknow and it is this city that has impacted her work the most. She did her schooling from Carmel Convent and Hoerner School and her higher studies from Lucknow University. She did her Masters (M.Sc.) In Environmental Sciences from the Lucknow University. She trained in the professional category of Kathak Dance at the Kathak Kendra under the UP Sangeet Natak Academy .

She trained initially in the Lucknow gharana of kathak under the guidance of Arjun Mishra. She also studied abhinaya under Kalanidhi Narayan at Protima Bedi’s Nrityagram. She closely studied Baba Bulleh Shah’s contribution to Punjabi Sufi traditions. Mawlana Rumi and Amir Khusro also influenced her.

Career
Chaturvedi began her career as a Kathak dancer. She attempts at building an interface with diverse forms like the music of Rajasthan, Kashmir, Awadh, Punjab, Turkmenistan, Iran and Krygistan. She is particularly drawn to Sufi mysticism and has endeavoured to incorporate movements in her performances that are reminiscent of the meditative practices of the whirling dervishes. She has therefore, chosen to name her dance style as Sufi Kathak.[2]

She performed at the Taj Mahal and Sydney Opera House. [3] [4]

She did a Sufi music video directed by Vishal Bhardwaj and written by Gulzar called as Tere Ishq Mein. [5]

She has performed in more than 300 concerts in more than 22 countries across the world. In the last two decades, Manjari has performed concerts all over the world including Europe (France, Germany, Portugal, Italy, Austria, Switzerland, U.K. & Ireland), Armenia, Georgia, the Middle East (Dubai, Bahrain, Abu Dhabi, Qatar, Kuwait), South East Asia (Singapore, Malaysia, Sri Lanka) and Central Asia (Turkmenistan, Kyrgyzstan, Uzbekistan, Tajikistan) along with Australia and America.

Significant Venues 

 India International Centre
 Kalaghoda, Mumbai
 Tagore Auditorium, Chandigarh
 Chowmahalla Palace, Hyderabad
 Aravali Bio Diversity Park, Gurgaon
 Jumeirah Beach Hotel, Dubai
 Indira Gandhi National Centre for Arts, New Delhi
 Symphony Space, New York City
 Judith Wright Centre for Performing Arts – Brisbane
 Smithsonian Museum, Washington DC
 Royal Festival Hall, South Bank Centre, London, UK
 Sydney Opera House, Australia
 National Gallery of Victoria, Australia
 Rashtrapati Bhawan
 Parliament House
 Medinat Jumeirah
 Purana Quila
 Jagmandir Palace, Udaipur
 Lake Palace, Udaipur
 Aman-E-Bagh
 Ram Bagh Palace, Jaipur
 Lotus Temple, New Delhi
 Town Hall, Kolkata
 Qutb Minar, New Dlehi
 Murshidabad Palace, Murshidabad
 Neemrana Fort
 Devigarh Fort
 Qila Mubarak, Patiala
 Jagatjit Palace, Kapurthala
 Khajuraho Temple
 Janana Mahal, Udaipur
 Amber Fort, Jaipur
 Fatehpur Sikri
 Arab Ki Sarai, Humayun’s Tomb
 Holkar Palace, Maheshwar
 Taj Mahal, Agra
 Dilkusha Palace, Lucknow

Dance of Mystics
She has been the part of the Sufi Symposium at the prestigious Smithsonian Museum Washington D.C. and of the conference on Living heritage by UNESCO and is the Jury and member of "Think Tank on Asian dance" for the prestigious Asian Dance Committee in Korea. In the past decade Manjari Chaturvedi has collaborated and performed with a wide range of international artists as Global Fusion with Tim Ries (Saxophone, Rolling Stones, USA) And Ustad Shujaat Hussain Khan (Sitar, India), Taufiq Quereshi (India), Kailash Kher (India), Kevin Hays (Piano, USA), Dhaffer Yoseuf (Oudh, Vocals, Tunisia), Rahim Al Hajj ( Oudh, Iraq), Patrick Possey (Saxophone, USA), Firas Shahrstan (Qanun, Syria), Micheal Glenn (Bass, USA).

SHORT FILMS AND VIDEOS She did a Sufi music video directed by Vishal Bhardwaj and written by Gulzar called as Tere Ishq Mein. She has performed in ZARA THAHER JAAO: a Dance sequence on music by Ustad Amjad Ali Khan She has performed in JASHN-E-AWADH: An audio visual for the Taj Group of Hotels She has performed in SOULFUL STRINGS OF SARANGI: A film by Pamela Rooks She has performed in HISTORICAL JOURNEY OF TAJ HOTELS, RESORTS & PALACES: A film directed by Zafar Hai She has performed in AMIR KHUSRAU: A film for National Television directed by Muzaffar Ali She has performed in RAQS-E-DIL: A film for National Television by Muzaffar Ali She has performed in RUMI IN THE LAND OF KHUSRAU: A film on the Sufi traditions across the world She has done dance direction and choreography in HUSN-E-JAANA a television serial by Muzaffar Ali She has performed in THE LEGACY OF AN ERA: A film on Lucknow by Mazhar Kamran.

The Courtesan Project

A brilliant initiative by Manjari Chaturvedi that is dedicated to work towards removing social stigmas associated with Courtesan, the Tawaifs, and thereby giving them much deserved respect and place as artists par excellence. "The Lost Songs and Dance of Courtesans - Gender discrimination in Arts and How it Shapes the Art for Future" is a project that archives and documents the lives and stories of the incredible women performers.[8]

Manjari has undertaken an absolutely new work, it is a lot of research as it brings alive dance and stories of women who were stigmatised by the society for being performers both music and dance and in an unfortunate society ridden by gender discrimination were not even part of the documentation history of the performing arts. Hence it becomes imminent we tell their brilliant stories to the world and show their dance. In the wake of inadequate research and documentation, several myths and misconceptions shroud lives and history of courtesans.

Today, it is not uncommon to have the words ‘courtesan’ and ‘prostitute’ being used inter-changeably. This is the greatest error that has been continually done. In an extremely unfair record of history based on gender inequality, the men pursuing these arts are revered as "Ustads" (Masters) while the women pursuing the same arts became "Nautch Girls" (Dancing Girls). The current generations of erstwhile male court dancers talk about family lineage with a sense of pride extolling the greatness of their forefathers as dancers in royal courts. At the same time, the generations of women court dancers live with a sense of shame never disclosing their lineage or any connection with erstwhile courts. Gender discrimination in the field of arts has never been addressed and today this sect of women are ostracised in the society and considered "lesser" than their contemporary men.

Manjari says, "It is the need of the hour to question and challenge the "disregard" towards these women artists and their traditions. We must think about this as a collective society and a project like this helps to shape up the collective conscience of the society."

Controversy

Qawwali Performance Interrupted 
On 17 January 2020, Manjari Chaturvedi claimed that her qawwali performance was “deliberately” stopped midway by officials of the Uttar Pradesh government during an official cultural programme at a private hotel in Lucknow. However, the Department of Culture, Uttar Pradesh, denied the accusation.

See also
 List of Kathak dancers

References

Kathak exponents
Indian female classical dancers
Performers of Indian classical dance
1968 births
Living people
Dancers from Uttar Pradesh
Women artists from Uttar Pradesh
20th-century Indian dancers
20th-century Indian women artists